Chooz can denote several things:

 Chooz, Ardennes is a French commune
 The Chooz Nuclear Power Plant
 Chooz (experiment) was a physics experiment using the reactor as a neutrino source
 Double Chooz is a successor experiment, currently ongoing